Djezzar District is a district of Batna Province, Algeria.

Municipalities
Djezar
Abdelkader Azil
Ouled Ammar

Districts of Batna Province